William S. Busby is a retired United States Air Force major general. Prior to retirement he served as the mobilization assistant to the deputy commander, United States Strategic Command.

Military career
Busby was commissioned in 1974 after graduating from the North Carolina State University with a Bachelor of Science. He commanded the 149th Fighter Squadron, Virginia Air National Guard; the 455th Expeditionary Operations Group, Bagram Air Base in Afghanistan; and the Virginia Air National Guard, Joint Force Headquarters, Richmond. Busby served on two major command staffs as well as the Joint Staff of the Virginia National Guard.

Busby is a graduate of the College of William and Mary (Master of Business Administration, 1984), Air Command and Staff College (1996), Air War College (1999), and the Joint Forces Staff College (2008). He is a recipient of the Defense Superior Service Medal, Legion of Merit, Bronze Star Medal, Meritorious Service Medal with oak leaf cluster, Air Medal, Aerial Achievement Medal, Air Force Commendation Medal, and Air Force Achievement Medal.

Assignments
 October 1974 – October 1975, student, undergraduate pilot training, Craig Air Force Base, Alabama
 October 1975 – August 1976, student, F-4 Operational Training Course, 56th Tactical Fighter Wing, MacDill Air Force Base, Florida
 August 1976 – January 1978, aircraft commander, F-4E, 59th Tactical Fighter Squadron, Eglin Air Force Base, Florida
 January 1978 – April 1978, student, Patrick Air Force Base, Florida
 May 1978 – February 1981, forward air controller, OV-10,704th Tactical Air Support Squadron, United States Air Forces in Europe, Sembach Air Base, Germany
 February 1983 – September 1983, student, 162nd Tactical fighter Group
 September 1983 – September 1991, pilot, A-7D, 149th Tactical Fighter Squadron
 September 1991 – June 1995, pilot, F-16C, 149th Fighter Squadron
 July 1995 – June 1996, flight commander of 149th Fighter Squadron
 July 1996 – November 1998, operations officer, 149th Fighter Squadron, Virginia Air National Guard
 December 1998 – November 2000, commander of 149th Fighter Squadron, Virginia Air National Guard
 December 2000 – August 2002, vice commander of 192nd Fighter Wing, Virginia Air National Guard
 August 2002 – August 2004, director of operations, Joint Force Headquarters, Virginia Air National Guard. Also served – May 2003 – Sep 2003, commander of 455th Expeditionary Operations Group, Bagram Air Base, Afghanistan.
 August 2004 – November 2005, chief of staff, Virginia Air National Guard
 November 2005 – July 2006, assistant adjutant general for air, Virginia Air National Guard
 July 2006 – January 2007, chief of staff, Virginia Air National Guard
 January 2007 – May 2008, assistant adjutant general for air, Virginia Air National Guard. Also served – April 2007 – May 2008 assistant to the assistant secretary of the Air Force, Manpower and Reserve Affairs, the Pentagon, Washington, District of Columbia
 May 2008 – May 2012, mobilization assistant to the deputy commander of United States Strategic Command, Offutt Air Force Base

References
Major General William S. Busby, III at U.S. Air Force

Living people
Recipients of the Defense Superior Service Medal
Recipients of the Legion of Merit
United States Air Force generals
United States Air Force personnel of the War in Afghanistan (2001–2021)
Year of birth missing (living people)